Icelandic Air Policing is a NATO operation conducted to patrol Iceland's airspace. As Iceland does not have an air force, in 2006 it requested that its NATO allies periodically deploy fighter aircraft to Keflavik Air Base to provide protection of its airspace. The first deployment of aircraft took place in May 2008.

Background
As Iceland does not maintain an air force, the country was left without means to patrol its airspace when the United States Air Force (USAF) ceased deploying fighter units to Keflavik Air Base in September 2006, and the U.S. Iceland Defense Force was withdrawn. Following the American withdrawal Russian Air Force 37th Air Army aircraft entered Icelandic airspace on several occasions.

Prime Minister Geir Haarde requested that Iceland's NATO allies assume responsibility for protecting Iceland's airspace during the Riga Summit in November 2006. The North Atlantic Council agreed to this request at its July 2007 meeting. The other NATO member states who lack the ability to patrol their own airspace have similar arrangements in place. In March 2008, Prime Minister Haarde denied that the air policing operation was targeting Russian aircraft, and stated that "It is going to be a general patrolling exercise. We consider Russia to be our friends, by the way."

In contrast with the Baltic Air Policing mission, which involves the continuous presence of fighter aircraft from NATO countries at Šiauliai International Airport in Lithuania and Ämari Air Base in Estonia, the Icelandic government requested that NATO not maintain a permanent force at Keflavik. Instead, an average of three deployments are made per year, with each lasting from three to four weeks. Most deployments involve four fighter aircraft, though the number varies with some being larger.

As of January 2013, NATO had re-designated the deployments to Iceland as being the "Airborne Surveillance and Interception Capabilities to meet Iceland's Peacetime Preparedness Needs" mission, and emphasised to reporters that it was focused on training rather than air policing.

Since 2014 the aircraft deployed to Iceland have been placed on Quick Reaction Alert (QRA) status and flown armed patrols. While these tasks were not previously undertaken, it was decided to commence them in response to the deterioration in relations between Russia and NATO countries following the annexation of Crimea by the Russian Federation and the conflict in Donbass, Ukraine.

In 2018, the deployments to Iceland came under the Allied Air Command and were controlled by NATO's northern Combined Air Operations Centre at Uedem in Germany. The Combined Air Operations Centre manages NATO air policing north of the Alps, including by controlling the Baltic Air Policing operation.

In March 2022 it was reported that the Icelandic government was considering whether a continuous air policing presence was required due to the increased threat resulting from the Russian invasion of Ukraine. Formal discussions of the matter had not yet taken place.

Deployments

The following deployments have been made to Iceland:

A planned deployment of four British Royal Air Force Eurofighter Typhoons from No. 3 (F) Squadron in December 2008 was cancelled as a result of the Icesave dispute between Britain and Iceland. Poland also cancelled a planned deployment of F-16 fighters to Iceland in 2010 due to the impact of the financial crisis of 2007–2010. As part of the terms of an agreement signed in March 2019 between the British and Icelandic governments, the RAF was scheduled to undertake an air policing deployment to Iceland in 2019.

Fighter aircraft deployed to Iceland are accompanied by NATO Boeing E-3 Sentry AWACS aircraft to enhance the Iceland Air Defence System radar network as well as other supporting aircraft as required.

In addition to the NATO deployments, fighter aircraft from Finland and Sweden have also undertaken training in Iceland.

References

External links
 

NATO Air Policing
Defence of Iceland
Aviation in Iceland
Military aviation